Hibbertia ferox is a species of flowering plant in the family Dilleniaceae and is endemic to Queensland. It is a shrub with sharply-pointed linear leaves and yellow flowers, usually with nine stamens in a single group on one side of two glabrous carpels.

Description
There are usually nine stamens free from each other on one side of two glabrous carpels.

Taxonomy
Hibbertia ferox was first formally described in 2018 Betsy Rivers Jackes in the journal  Austrobaileya from specimens collected in the White Mountains National Park in 2000. The specific epithet (ferox) means "fierce" referring to the sharp point on the end of the leaves.

Distribution and habitat
This hibbertia grows on sandy soils and is common on the Burra Range in the White Mountains National Park.

Conservation status
Hibbertia ferox is listed as of "least concern" under the Queensland Government Nature Conservation Act 1992.

See also
List of Hibbertia species

References

ferox
Flora of Queensland
Plants described in 2018